Hugh Alexander Taylor (22 January 1920 – 11 September 2005) was an English-born Canadian archivist, archival theorist and educator.

Born in England in 1920, Hugh Taylor studied History at the University of Oxford and took his Archives Diploma at the University of Liverpool.  His early archival career in England included positions with the Leeds Public Libraries, Liverpool Public Libraries, the County of Northumberland, and the University of Newcastle upon Tyne.

Taylor emigrated to Canada in 1965, taking the position of founding Provincial Archivist of the Provincial Archives of Alberta.  He also became founding Provincial Archivist of New Brunswick in 1967 and joined the Public Archives of Canada (PAC) in 1971 as Director of the Historical Branch, which he renamed the Archives Branch shortly after his arrival. He established eight divisions within his branch, including media and maps. Taylor left the Public Archives of Canada to become the Provincial Archivist of Nova Scotia in 1978, retiring in 1982 to Wolfville, NS. He and his wife moved to Qualicum Beach in 1989, and later to Victoria in 1993.

During his career at the Public Archives of Canada, Taylor undertook numerous initiatives that shaped that institution as well as the archival profession. Internally, he recreated its organizational structure to highlight the strength of its media-based archives.  He was also a strong supporter of the newly formed Association of Canadian Archivists as well as its new scholarly journal, Archivaria. He served as president of the Society of American Archivists (SAA) from 1978 to 1979.

He died in Victoria, BC on 11 September 2005.

Contributions to archival theory 
Taylor’s essays and ideas exploring the nature of archives were possibly the most influential aspect of his career.  As Terry Cook noted in his 2005 obituary, Taylor "was intent on constructing archives anew, imagining them as places where archivists connect their records with social issues, with new media and recording technologies, with the historical traditions of archives, with the earth’s ecological systems, and with the broader search for spiritual meaning."

Public recognition 
The Association of Canadian Archivists awarded Taylor the W. Kaye Lamb Award for best writing in Archivaria as well as honorary membership in 1990.  He was named an Officer of the Order of Canada in 1990.  In 1992, the Association of Canadian Archivists published The Archival Imagination: Essays in Honour of Hugh A. Taylor, a festschrift written by archivists whom he had inspired. A collection of his most influential essays, Imagining Archives:  Essays and Reflections by Hugh A. Taylor, appeared in 2002.  In 2006, the Association of Canadian Archivists established the Hugh A. Taylor Prize, presented to the writer of the Archivaria article that presents new ideas or syntheses in new and imaginative ways.

Personal life 
Taylor joined the Royal Air Force (RAF) in 1939 and served as a wireless operator through the Second World War. Following the war, while at Oxford University he was part of the rowing crew for Keble College.  

Taylor met his wife, Daphne Mary Johnson, through the Ecumenical Movement in England in 1958. They were married on January 3, 1959 and had three daughters: Madeline, Mary and Ruth. The family emigrated to Canada in 1965.

Notable quotes 
The archivist, then, has a unique opportunity in the future if he addresses himself to this vital task of information retrieval, in both the field of historical and modern records.  His resources will span the present and the past, and he will hold the key to decision-making and research alike.  His bank of interest will be far wider than that of the records manager, but he must learn the language of the computer like his native tongue if he is not to be relegated to the fringes of administration from which he came We must not be seduced by a kind of academic dolce vita or we will surely die as archivists and will fail to ensure for the future of the continuation of that record which has, by so much effort, been saved from the past.For us archivists, there can be no conclusions, no finality, no ober dicta. We are the builders of bridges, no castles, as we cross from the assurance of 'now' to the uncertainty of 'new'...There is, I believe, a spiritual element to all this which resides perhaps in the imagination, with faith as a neighbour, through which we come to recognize the humans we are meant to be.

List of publications

See also 
List of archivists

References

Further reading
Cook, Terry. "Hugh A. Taylor, 1920-2005," Archivaria 60 (Fall 2005): 275-282
Craig, Barbara L. "Meeting the Future by Returning to the Past: A commentary on Hugh Taylor's Transformations." Archivaria 25 (Winter 1987-1988): 7-11.
Craig, Barbara L., editor. The Archival Imagination: Essays in Honour of Hugh A. Taylor. Ottawa: Association of Canadian Archivists, 1992. 264 pp.
Hugh A. Taylor correspondence. Nova Scotia Archives and Records Management fonds. RG 53, vol. 111-128. Nova Scotia Archives (Halifax, NS). See: https://memoryns.ca/hugh-taylor-correspondence

1920 births
2005 deaths
Canadian archivists
British emigrants to Canada
Alumni of the University of Liverpool
Alumni of the University of Oxford